The Tao Zhu Yin Yuan, also known as Agora Garden, is a residential high-rise building located in Xinyi Special District, Xinyi District, Taipei, Taiwan. The tower was designed by the Belgian architect Vincent Callebaut and was completed in 2018. The building has received a LEED Gold energy label as well as a Diamond level awarded by the Low Carbon Building Alliance.

Design
The residential building has a special appearance and is a rare twisting building, which is modelled after a DNA strand in the form of a double helix rotating 90 degrees from top to bottom, with each floor rotating 4.5 degrees from the previous. There is also a helipad located on the top floor. There are seven elevators inside, one of which can carry supercars and ambulances. The building is covered in approximately 20,000 trees and shrubs, which is aimed to reduce the carbon footprint of Taipei by absorbing around 130 tonnes of carbon dioxide emissions each year.

Awards
CTBUH Award 2015: Innovation Award 2015 Award of Excellence
German Design Award 2018: Excellent Communications Design Architecture

Gallery

See also 
 List of tallest buildings in Taipei
 Vincent Callebaut
 Polaris Garden
 55 Timeless
 Kingdom of Global View

References

External List
Official Website of Tao Zhu Yin Yuan 

2018 establishments in Taiwan
Residential buildings completed in 2018
Residential skyscrapers in Taiwan
Skyscrapers in Taipei
Apartment buildings in Taiwan
Postmodern architecture in Taiwan
Futurist architecture